Middle Ground or middle ground may refer to:

Places 
Middle Ground (New Rochelle),  a large submerged reef in the city of New Rochelle, New York, United States
Middle Ground (India), an island within Mumbai Harbour, India
An area of the Midwestern United States called the "Middle Ground" due to the dispute between British settlers and Native Americans over to whom the land should belong

Art and entertainment 
The Middle Ground, a 1980 novel by Margaret Drabble
"Middle Ground" (The Wire), a 2004 television episode
"Middle Ground", an episode of The Good Doctor

Other 
 Middle ground (also: middle-ground or middleground), an artistic space, located between background and foreground
 Middleground (1947–1972), American Thoroughbred racehorse
 Golden mean (philosophy), a desirable "middle ground" between two extremes.
 Argument to moderation, a logical fallacy that states that the "middle ground" is always correct